Ulla Lindström (born 17 April 1943) is a Swedish gymnast. She competed at the 1960 Summer Olympics and the 1964 Summer Olympics.

References

External links
 

1943 births
Living people
Swedish female artistic gymnasts
Olympic gymnasts of Sweden
Gymnasts at the 1960 Summer Olympics
Gymnasts at the 1964 Summer Olympics
People from Huskvarna
Sportspeople from Jönköping County
20th-century Swedish women